The  Lakshmikanta Temple  is a Hindu (Vaishnava) temple in Kalale, a village in the Nanjangud taluk of the Mysore district, Karnataka state, India. The temple dates back at least to the early 18th century and is built in typical dravidian style. The temple is a protected monument under the Karnataka state division of the Archaeological Survey of India.

History
The Lakshmikanta temple was under the patronage of some of the kings of the Mysore Kingdom. It was expanded and lavish grants were made by king Dodda Krishnaraja I of the Mysore Wodeyar dynasty before c.1732. In the early 18th century, Dalavoy (feudal lord) Devarajiah of the powerful Kalale family donated the impressive metallic figure of the Hindu god Rama to the temple during his last years. According to Habib, Hasan and Sampath, in 1791, the de facto ruler of Mysore, Tipu Sultan, gave the temple gifts in silver including four cups, a plate and a spittoon (padiga). Habib and Hasan claim the inscriptions on the gifts itself provides evidence that the gifts were made by "Tipu Sultan Bahshah".

Gallery

References

18th-century Hindu temples
Devi temples in Karnataka
Hindu temples in Mysore district